"Back Then" is a song by Australian boy band CDB, released in December 1997 as the second single from their second studio album, Lifted (1997). The song peaked at number 42 on the ARIA Charts.

Track listing
'''CD single (665254 2)
 "Back Then"	
 "Sanctified"	
 "Back Then"  (Acoustic Version featuring Tommy Emmanuel) 
 "Back Then"  (Instrumental)

Charts
"Back Then" debuted on the Australian song chart at number 49. It peaked at number 42 the following week.

References

1997 singles
CDB (band) songs
1997 songs
Sony Music Australia singles
Songs written by Gary Pinto
Songs about nostalgia